Andrew Loughrey (1844 – 24 September 1913) was a 19th-century Member of Parliament from Christchurch, New Zealand.

Biography

Loughrey was born in Melbourne and educated at Melbourne University College in law. He worked as a barrister and solicitor at the Supreme Court of Victoria. He later became an Inspector of Schools for the Victorian Education Department.

Loughrey emigrated to Christchurch in 1880. He formed the law firm 'Holmes and Loughrey' with John Holmes, which was succeeded by 'Loughrey and Lane' (with B. L. Lane) upon Holmes' retirement before Loughrey practised on his own.

He represented the Linwood electorate from 1887 when he defeated Daniel Reese, to 1890 when he retired. He was a supporter of the Stout–Vogel Ministry.

Loughrey died on 24 September 1913.

References

1844 births
1913 deaths
Members of the New Zealand House of Representatives
New Zealand MPs for Christchurch electorates
19th-century New Zealand politicians
Politicians from Melbourne
Australian emigrants to New Zealand
19th-century New Zealand lawyers